Marko Ewout Koers (born November 3, 1972, in Molenhoek, Limburg) is a retired middle distance runner from the Netherlands, who represented his native country at three consecutive Summer Olympics, starting in 1992. He competed in the 800 and 1500 metres. Koers won the silver medal in the 800 metres at the 1998 European Indoor Athletics Championships, behind Germany's Nils Schumann.

Competition record

References
  Dutch Olympic Committee

1972 births
Living people
Dutch male middle-distance runners
Olympic athletes of the Netherlands
Athletes (track and field) at the 1992 Summer Olympics
Athletes (track and field) at the 1996 Summer Olympics
Athletes (track and field) at the 2000 Summer Olympics
Illinois Fighting Illini men's track and field athletes
People from Mook en Middelaar
Universiade medalists in athletics (track and field)
World Athletics Championships athletes for the Netherlands
Universiade gold medalists for the Netherlands
Medalists at the 1993 Summer Universiade
Sportspeople from Limburg (Netherlands)
20th-century Dutch people